A long-running blue plaque scheme is in operation in Gateshead, Tyne and Wear. Administered by the local council, the scheme was registered with English Heritage in 1970 and 21 blue plaques were installed from the inception of the scheme until 1996. Although the scheme was never formally closed, only one further plaque was then unveiled prior to the presentation of a 'report to cabinet' on 16 November 2004 which recommended that the scheme be revived. Seven further plaques were installed prior to the publication of a commemorative council document in 2010, bringing the total to 29, though a number of further plaques have been installed since that date.

The Gateshead scheme aims to highlight notable persons who lived in the borough, notable buildings within it and important historical events. An individual will only be considered for commemoration by Gateshead blue plaque if they meet the suggested criteria laid out in the 2004 'report to cabinet'. These are that the individual has sufficient local standing, is regarded as an eminent member of their profession, calling or field or has made some important contribution to "human welfare or happiness". The individual must have lived in Gateshead and either had a significant impact on the borough or are of such national or international eminence that their association with the borough is itself noteworthy. They must also be deceased. Some of those commemorated through the scheme include Geordie Ridley, author of the Blaydon Races, William Wailes, a noted 19th century proponent of stained glass who lived in a "fairytale mansion" at Saltwell Park, the industrialist and co-founder of Clarke Chapman, William Clarke and Sir Joseph Swan, the inventor of the incandescent light bulb whose house in Low Fell was the first in the world to be illuminated by electric light.

An historical event will be considered suitable for a Gateshead blue plaque so long as it was not a usual occurrence, had a significant impact on local or national history and can be readily associated with a building or structure to which the corresponding plaque can be appended. Events commemorated by Gateshead blue plaque include the 19th century Felling mining disasters, one of which included "one of the most tremendous explosions in the history of coal mining" and which killed 92 men and boys.

Gateshead blue plaques

Notes

References

Bibliography

 
 

Gateshead